Gentiana purpurea, the purple gentian, is a plant species in the genus Gentiana. Flowers from July to August. The root is sometimes used in the manufacture of gentian bitters. It is native to Central and Northern Europe.

External links 
Gentiana purpurea.

purpurea
Alpine flora
Plants described in 1753
Taxa named by Carl Linnaeus